The 2016 Scottish Challenge Cup final, also known as the Petrofac Training Cup final for sponsorship reasons, is a football match that took place on 10 April 2016 at Hampden Park, between Rangers and Peterhead. Rangers won the match by 4 goals to nil. It was the 25th final of the Scottish Challenge Cup since it was first organised in 1990 to celebrate the centenary of the now defunct Scottish Football League and the third Challenge Cup final since the SPFL was formed. Both teams progressed through four elimination rounds to reach the final.

Route to the final

The competition is a knock-out tournament and in 2015–16 was contested by 32 teams. Those participating were the 30 clubs that played in the Championship, League One and League Two of the Scottish Professional Football League, while the winners of the Highland League (Brora Rangers) and the Lowland Football League (Edinburgh City) were also invited. For the first and second rounds only, the draw was divided into two geographical regions – north and south. Teams were paired at random and the winner of each match progressed to the next round and the loser was eliminated.

Rangers

Peterhead

Match details

References

Scottish Challenge Cup Finals
Scottish Challenge Cup Final 2016
Scottish Challenge Cup Final 2016
Challenge Cup Final
3